The Convention on the Recovery Abroad of Maintenance is a 1956 United Nations treaty which allows individuals to enforce judicial decisions regarding child support and alimony extraterritorially. It can be used only if the person seeking maintenance and the person paying maintenance are both resident in states that have ratified the Convention.

The Convention was concluded on 20 June 1956 at the United Nations Conference on Maintenance Obligations, held at UN headquarters in New York from 29 May to 20 June. It was signed by 24 and entered into force on 25 May 1957. As of 2015, there are 64 states that have ratified the Convention, which includes 63 United Nations member states plus the Holy See.

The principles contained in the Convention were updated in 2007 with the conclusion of the Hague Convention on the International Recovery of Child Support and Other Forms of Family Maintenance.

External links
Text
Ratifications

1956 in New York City
Child support
Family law treaties
Treaties concluded in 1956
Treaties entered into force in 1957
United Nations treaties
Treaties of Algeria
Treaties of Argentina
Treaties of Australia
Treaties of Austria
Treaties of Barbados
Treaties of Belarus
Treaties of Belgium
Treaties of Bosnia and Herzegovina
Treaties of the Second Brazilian Republic
Treaties of Burkina Faso
Treaties of Cape Verde
Treaties of the Central African Republic
Treaties of Chile
Treaties of Colombia
Treaties of Croatia
Treaties of Cuba
Treaties of Cyprus
Treaties of the Czech Republic
Treaties of Czechoslovakia
Treaties of Denmark
Treaties of Ecuador
Treaties of Estonia
Treaties of Finland
Treaties of France
Treaties of West Germany
Treaties of the Kingdom of Greece
Treaties of Guatemala
Treaties of Haiti
Treaties of the Holy See
Treaties of the Hungarian People's Republic
Treaties of Ireland
Treaties of Israel
Treaties of Italy
Treaties of Kazakhstan
Treaties of Kyrgyzstan
Treaties of Liberia
Treaties of Luxembourg
Treaties of Mexico
Treaties of Monaco
Treaties of Montenegro
Treaties of Morocco
Treaties of the Netherlands
Treaties of New Zealand
Treaties of Niger
Treaties of Norway
Treaties of Pakistan
Treaties of the Philippines
Treaties of the Polish People's Republic
Treaties of the Estado Novo (Portugal)
Treaties of Moldova
Treaties of Romania
Treaties of Serbia and Montenegro
Treaties of Seychelles
Treaties of Slovakia
Treaties of Slovenia
Treaties of Francoist Spain
Treaties of the Dominion of Ceylon
Treaties of Suriname
Treaties of Sweden
Treaties of Switzerland
Treaties of North Macedonia
Treaties of Tunisia
Treaties of Turkey
Treaties of Ukraine
Treaties of the United Kingdom
Treaties of Uruguay
Treaties extended to Norfolk Island
Treaties extended to the Faroe Islands
Treaties extended to Greenland
Treaties extended to French Comoros
Treaties extended to French Polynesia
Treaties extended to French Somaliland
Treaties extended to New Caledonia
Treaties extended to Saint Pierre and Miquelon
Treaties extended to French Algeria
Treaties extended to Guadeloupe
Treaties extended to French Guiana
Treaties extended to Martinique
Treaties extended to Réunion
Treaties extended to West Berlin
Treaties extended to the Netherlands Antilles
Treaties extended to Aruba
Treaties extended to the Isle of Man
Treaties extended to Jersey